Sijilmasi or Sijilmassi (in Arabic سجلماسي) sometimes with Al- (السجلماسي) added may refer to

Ibrahim ibn Hilal al-Sijilmasi (d. 1498)
Mohammed ibn Abu al-Qasim al-Sijilmasi (d. 1800)
Ahmed ibn al-Mubarak al-Lamati al-Sijilmasi (d. 1743)
Abu Mohammed al-Qasim al-Siljilmasi (d. 1304)
Fathallah Sijilmassi, Moroccan politician and economist